The Main Computation Centre of the General Staff (GVC) is a unit of the Russian Armed Forces dedicated to the guidance and control of missiles such as the sea-launched ЗМ-14 or Kalibr, ground-launched R-500 aka 9М728 or Iskander systems and air-launched Kh-101. The group is found at a minimum of two locations: the Ministry of Defence headquarters Znamenka Street 19 in Moscow, and at the Admiralty headquarters in St. Petersburg. It is currently led by Major General Robert Baranov.

Operations
The programmes for the flight path of the cruise missiles are generated remotely at GVC facilities in St. Petersburg or Moscow and transferred on a USB memory stick to the missile before launch, for example at an airfield, on board a truck, or at sea or a naval base in the case of a submarine.

References

Military units and formations of Russia
1963 establishments in Russia